Lincoln Airport  (formerly Lincoln Municipal Airport) is a public/military airport  northwest of downtown Lincoln, the state capital, in Lancaster County, Nebraska, United States. It is owned by the Lincoln Airport Authority and is the second-largest airport in Nebraska. It has four gates with jetways, to be, expanded to six.

The 12,901 foot primary runway was a designated emergency landing site for the Space Shuttle, although it was never used as such. The runway can handle heavy military aircraft including the C-5 Galaxy and the Boeing E-4. The airport is also the home of Lincoln Air National Guard Base, an installation for the KC-135R Stratotanker aircraft operated by the 155th Air Refueling Wing (155 ARW) of the Nebraska Air National Guard. Airliners on charter flights by visiting college athletic teams which play the Nebraska Cornhuskers also utilize Lincoln Airport as a primary destination. The airport is home to Duncan Aviation, a family-owned aircraft maintenance and refurbishing company. Duncan Aviation has hangars on the east side of the airport and parts storage on the west side.

Lincoln Airport appeared in the 1983 movie Terms of Endearment,  the 2008 film Yes Man, and the 2013 animated film Planes.

History

What would become Lincoln Airport began in the early 1920s when the city selected a plot of land Northwest of the city to be used as a municipal airport. Charles Lindbergh  learned to fly at Lincoln Airfield in 1922. The airfield became an air mail stop in 1928 and became a United Air Lines stop during 1927; United continues to serve Lincoln to this day through its regional partners.

The Lincoln Airplane and Flying School was established in 1928 and operated at the airfield (which briefly was known as Lindbergh Field), before later moving to Union Airport a few miles east.  In 1939, the Lincoln Airplane and Flying School was one of nine civilian contract flight schools contracted by the United States Army Air Corps as Lincoln Army Air Field for basic flight training of air cadets under the 4500 pilot training expansion program.  The school was operated by E. J. Sias.  However, due to the short summer flying season, flight training in Lincoln was closed on 15 November 1940 and moved to Drane Field in Lakeland, Florida where it reopened with new owners under the name "Lakeland School of Aeronautics" and continued Army contract pilot training.  As part of the contract flying school, the Air Corps established the 47th Training Detachment to command the military flight cadets at the school, which apparently also moved to Lakeland along with the school. The school/base
closed in December 1945 and was transferred back to the City of Lincoln.

Along with its civil use, Lincoln Airport became host to a flying unit of the newly formed Nebraska Air National Guard along with a Naval Reserve unit flying patrol aircraft. The 173rd Fighter Squadron became the host unit of what became known as Lincoln Air National Guard Base.  Equipped with P-51 Mustang fighters in 1946, it was the second Air National Guard unit established. A few years later, F-80C Shooting Star jet fighters would replace the unit's F-51s until the advent of the Korean War. The United States Navy Reserve also established Naval Air Station Lincoln (NAS Lincoln) on the airport, primarily as home to Patrol Squadron 762 (VP-762) and its P-2 Neptune aircraft.

In 1952 the facility re-opened as Lincoln Air Force Base. After operating as a Strategic Air Command (SAC) base supporting Boeing B-47 Stratojet bombers, Boeing KC-97 Stratofreighter refueling aircraft (by 1954) and SM-65 Atlas intercontinental ballistic missiles (by 1962), the United States Air Force closed the installation in 1966.

During the 1960s the two main airlines at Lincoln were United Airlines and the original Frontier Airlines. Frontier Convair 580s flew nonstop and direct to Denver and Kansas City. United Douglas DC-6Bs flew nonstop to Denver, but nonstops to Chicago didn't start until 1967. Lincoln's first jet service began in 1966, with Frontier Boeing 727-100s operating between Denver and Kansas City via Lincoln.

United Boeing 727-100s and Boeing 737-200s began flying nonstop to Chicago and Denver about 1968; LNK later saw United 727-200s, 737-300s, 737-500s and Airbus A320s. Frontier later operated 737-200s.

Other jet service was operated by America West with Boeing 737-200s and 737-300s nonstop to Phoenix and Trans World Airlines (TWA) DC-9s nonstop to St. Louis. In 1983, Midway Airlines was operating Douglas DC-9-10 jets direct to Chicago Midway Airport via a stop in Omaha.  By 1985, three airlines were operating jet service into the airport according to the Official Airline Guide (OAG) including Air Wisconsin with British Aircraft Corporation BAC One-Elevens nonstop from Chicago O'Hare Airport and Grand Island, NE, Frontier with Boeing 737-200s and McDonnell Douglas MD-80s nonstop from Denver and Omaha, and United with Boeing 727-100s and Boeing 737-200s nonstop from Chicago O'Hare, Denver, Cedar Rapids and Peoria, IL.  The original Frontier Airlines ceased operations in 1986; successor Continental Airlines flew 737s and DC-9s to Denver. United mainline jet service was eventually replaced by flights operated by its United Express partners who now fly 50 seat regional jets from LNK.

In 2005, Northwest Airlines flew to Memphis but dropped the route within nine months.  In early 2006, Allegiant Air began air service to Las Vegas but after two years, announced that it was transferring service to Grand Island, NE.  In May 2014 Delta Air Lines announced a non-stop flight to Atlanta would start September 8, resuming a service it briefly ran in 2009. In 2011 Delta resumed the Memphis service, but only over the summer. $750,000 in federal spending was used to guarantee revenue for Delta.

Today part of Lincoln Airport is home to the Nebraska Air National Guard's 155th Air Refueling Wing (155 ARW), an Air Mobility Command (AMC)-gained Air National Guard unit flying the KC-135R Stratotanker. Several Nebraska Army National Guard units are collocated at the installation, just east of Runway 36 alongside Taxiway Delta. The Air National Guard's tarmac is closed to general aviation and is guarded by Air Force Security Forces 24 hours a day.

Facilities

It has three asphalt/concrete runways: 18/36 is 12,901 by 200 feet (3,932 x 61 m); 14/32 is 8,649 by 150 feet (2,636 x 46 m); and 17/35 is 5,800 by 100 feet (1,768 x 30 m).

In the year ending March 31, 2016 the airport had 62,770 aircraft operations, average 172 per day: approximately 59% general aviation, 21% military, 13% airline and 7% air taxi. 199 aircraft were then based at this airport: approximately 53% single-engine,  approximately 25% multi-engine, 12% military, 7% jet and 3% helicopter.

Air National Guard

The current Lincoln Air National Guard Base is home to the Nebraska Air National Guard's 155th Air Refueling Wing (155 ARW), an Air Mobility Command (AMC)-gained Air National Guard unit flying the KC-135R Stratotanker. The 155 ARW is the nation's second oldest Air National Guard unit, being offered federal recognition on 26 July 1946 as the 173rd Fighter Squadron. It operates from a new facility built on the southeast side of the main runway.

Several Nebraska Army National Guard units are also collocated at the installation, located just east of Runway 36, alongside Taxiway Delta. The Air National Guard's tarmac is closed to general aviation and is guarded by the 155th Security Forces Squadron (155 SFS), an Air Force Security Forces unit.

Air National Guard and other military aircraft land on the same runways as commercial or general aviation aircraft destined for their respective terminals, but their crews and passengers are never deplaned into the Lincoln Airport Terminal, with military aircraft taxiing directly to Air National Guard facilities.

The base has also temporarily hosted aircraft and crews from the nearby 55th Wing at Offutt Air Force Base at times when Offutt's runway has been closed for repairs. The E-4B National Emergency Airborne Command Post (NEACP) aircraft have been based at the Air National Guard & SAC base three times: 2006,  then 2019 during the Missouri flood and 2021-22 subsequent runway replacement.

SAC base remains

Lincoln Airport and the Air National Guard use new facilities on the east and southeast side of the former SAC airfield. Located to the west side of the airfield, some of the large SAC hangars still are used, while others have been razed.  The B-47 parking ramp is unused, as well as the former B-47 alert pads (Christmas tree), still in evidence along the northwest end of runway 14/32.  There are pieces of concrete in the airfield area, disconnected from the runways and taxiways, which are remnants of the old wartime airfield from the 1940s.  The former Lincoln AFB hangars and ground station are under private ownership of numerous businesses and individuals, though the original fire station is still in use. The streets of the base still are in evidence, but many of the old military buildings have been torn down. The former military family housing area is now a part of the Arnold Heights Park community, and new housing has been built on the south side of the base.

Airlines and destinations

Passenger

Ground transportation
As of 2022, the local transit provider StarTran provides bus service to Lincoln Airport. The bus stop is located at the north end of the terminal loading/unloading area. Route 52 provides service to downtown, where transfers can be made, as well as providing direct service to the Highlands neighborhood northeast of the airport.

Statistics

Top destinations

Accidents
On September 25, 1973, a Learjet 25 operated by Lisa Jet crashed after takeoff bound for Eppley Field in low ceiling/fog conditions. All three occupants (two crew, one passenger) were killed. Inadequate preflight planning and poor crew coordination were the probable cause.

See also
 Nebraska World War II Army Airfields
 Nebraska Air National Guard
 List of airports in Nebraska
 Lincoln Air Force Base, the former Strategic Air Command base
 Airport (1970 film): the movie is set at a fictitious "Lincoln International Airport"

Notes

References

External links

 Lincoln Airport official site
 The Lincoln Air Force Base Legacy Project
 
 

Airports in Nebraska
Buildings and structures in Lincoln, Nebraska
Buildings and structures in Lancaster County, Nebraska
Transportation in Lincoln, Nebraska
History of Lincoln, Nebraska
Space Shuttle Emergency Landing Sites